Feta is a type of cheese.

Feta or FETA may also refer to:

 Federation of Environmental Trade Associations
 Fire Extinguishing Trades Association
 First European Transfer Agent
 Forth Estuary Transport Authority
 FETA, an identifier for alpha-fetoprotein a molecule produced in the developing embryo and fetus
 Feta (font), a font used for rendering musical notation, featured in the program LilyPond
 Feta Ahamada (born 1987), female sprinter from the Comoros

See also
FITA (disambiguation)
Fitter (disambiguation)
fetter